,
Nasser Fahad Adbdullah Al-Mansoor Al-Meaweed, known as Nasser Al-Mansoor, is a Saudi football defender who played for Saudi Arabia in the 1984 Asian Cup.

References

Stats

External links

Year of birth missing (living people)
Living people
Saudi Arabian footballers
Saudi Arabia international footballers
1984 AFC Asian Cup players
AFC Asian Cup-winning players
Association football defenders